Paisa is a 2016 Indian Tamil-language romantic drama film directing by Majith and starring Sree Raam and Aara .

Cast 
Sree Raam as Murugan
Aara  as Veni
Rajasimman as Kiruba
Madhusudhanan as Kiruba's boss
Nassar
Mayilsamy
Sendrayan
Theepetti Ganesan as Murugan's friend
Rockstar rajaguru as Murugan's Enemy

Production 
Sree Raam plays a rag picker in the film, which is about the Swachh Bharat Mission. The film is set in a slum.

Soundtrack 
Soundtrack was composed by JV.
"Penne Penne" – Jagadish, Hema Ambika
"Chikku Bukku" – Mukesh Mohamed, Hema Ambika
"Kanne" – Hema Ambika
"Paisa" – JV
"Nenjukulla" – Yazin Nizar

Release 
A critic from The Hindu wrote that "In other words, as moral-science movies go, Paisa is a far-easier watch than Appa". Malini Mannath of The New Indian Express opined that "Mildly entertaining, Paisa could have been made more appealing and interesting". A critic from Maalai Malar praised the performances of the lead cast, the music, and the cinematography while criticising the screenplay.

References 

Indian romantic drama films
2016 romantic drama films